The siege of Edessa (Arabic,  fatḥ al-Ruhāʾ) took place from November 28 to December 24, 1144, resulting in the fall of the capital of the crusader County of Edessa to Zengi, the atabeg of Mosul and Aleppo. This event was the catalyst for the Second Crusade.

Background 

The County of Edessa was the first of the crusader states to be established during and after the First Crusade. It dates from 1098 when Baldwin of Boulogne left the main army of the First Crusade and founded his own principality.

Edessa was the most northerly, the weakest, and the least populated; as such, it was subject to frequent attacks from the surrounding Muslim states ruled by the Ortoqids, Danishmends, and Seljuk Turks. Count Baldwin II and future count Joscelin of Courtenay were taken captive after their defeat at the Battle of Harran in 1104. Joscelin was captured a second time in 1122, and although Edessa recovered somewhat after the Battle of Azaz in 1125, Joscelin was killed in battle in 1131. His successor Joscelin II was forced into an alliance with the Byzantine Empire, but in 1143 both the Byzantine emperor John II Comnenus and the King of Jerusalem Fulk of Anjou died. John II was succeeded by his son Manuel I Comnenus, who had to deal with consolidating power at home against his elder brothers, while Fulk was succeeded by his wife Melisende and his son Baldwin III. Joscelin had also quarreled with Raymond II of Tripoli and Raymond of Poitiers, leaving Edessa with no powerful allies.

The siege of Edessa

In 1144, Joscelin was able to make an alliance with Kara Arslan, the Ortoqid ruler of Diyarbakır, against the growing power and influence of Zengi. Joscelin marched out of Edessa with almost his entire army to support Kara Aslan against Aleppo. Zengi, already seeking to take advantage of Fulk's death in 1143, hurried north to besiege Edessa, arriving on November 28. The city had been warned of his arrival and was prepared for a siege, but there was little they could do while Joscelin and the army were elsewhere.

The defense of the city was led by the Latin Archbishop Hugh, the Armenian Bishop John, and the Jacobite Bishop Basil bar Shumna. John and Basil ensured that none of the native Christians would desert to Zengi. When Joscelin heard of the siege he took the army to Turbessel, knowing that he could never dislodge Zengi without help from the other crusader states. In Jerusalem, Queen Melisende responded to Joscelin's appeal by sending an army led by Manasses of Hierges, Philip of Milly, and Elinand of Bures. Raymond of Poitiers ignored the call for help, as his army was already occupied against the Byzantine Empire in Cilicia.

Zengi surrounded the entire city, realizing that there was no army defending it. He built siege engines and began to mine the walls, while his forces were joined by Kurdish and Turcoman reinforcements. The inhabitants of Edessa resisted as much as they could, but had no experience in siege warfare; the city's numerous towers remained unmanned. They also had no knowledge of counter-mining, and part of the wall near the Gate of the Hours collapsed on December 24. Zengi's troops rushed into the city, killing all those who were unable to flee to the Citadel of Maniaces. Thousands more were suffocated or trampled to death in the panic, including Archbishop Hugh. Zengi ordered his men to stop the massacre, although all the Latin prisoners that he had taken were executed; the native Christians were allowed to live freely. The citadel was handed over on December 26. One of Zengi's commanders, Zayn ad-Din Ali Kutchuk, was appointed governor, while Bishop Basil, apparently willing to give his loyalty to whoever ruled the city, was recognized as leader of the Christian population.

Aftermath 

In January 1145 Zengi captured Saruj and besieged Birejik, but the army of Jerusalem had finally arrived and joined with Joscelin. Zengi also heard of trouble in Mosul, and rushed back to take control. There, he was praised throughout Islam as "defender of the faith" and al-Malik al-Mansur, the victorious king. Ibn al-Qaysarani praised his victory in a rhyming panegyric. He did not pursue an attack on the remaining territory of Edessa, or the Principality of Antioch, as was feared. Joscelin II continued to rule the remnants of the county to the west of the Euphrates from Turbessel, but little by little the rest of the territory was captured by the Muslims or sold to the Byzantines.

Zengi was assassinated by a slave in 1146 while besieging Qalat Jabar, and was succeeded in Aleppo by his son Nur ad-Din. Joscelin attempted to take back Edessa following Zengi's murder, and recaptured all but the citadel in October 1146. However, he had no help from the other crusader states, and his poorly planned expedition was driven out of Edessa by Nur ad-Din in November. Joscelin, fearing for the safety of the city's Christian Armenians, attempted to break a hole in Nur ad-Din's forces through which the natives could flee to safety. However, Joscelin's attempt failed and his fears came true when Nur al-Din's troops massacred the fleeing Armenians and forced the survivors into slavery.

By this time, news of the fall of Edessa reached Europe, and Raymond of Poitiers had already sent a delegation including Hugh, Bishop of Jabala, to seek aid from Pope Eugene III. On December 1, 1145, Eugene issued the papal bull Quantum praedecessores calling for the Second Crusade. This crusade was led by Louis VII of France and Conrad III of Germany, but by 1148 it had ended in disaster, and Edessa was never recovered.

In October 1146, Joscelin retook Edessa, but his victory lasted only a matter of days. Nur ad-Din quickly besieged the city and forced Joscelin to abandon it. The Christian population was massacred, enslaved or exiled and the city lost its importance.

References

Bibliography

Primary sources 

 The Damascus Chronicle of the Crusaders, extracted and translated from the Chronicle of Ibn al-Qalanisi. Edited and translated by H. A. R. Gibb. London, 1932.
 William of Tyre. A History of Deeds Done Beyond the Sea.  Edited and translated by E. A. Babcock and A. C. Krey. Columbia University Press, 1943.
 Armenia and the Crusades, Tenth to Twelfth Centuries: The Chronicle of Matthew of Edessa. Translated by Ara Edmond Dostourian. National Association for Armenian Studies and Research, 1993.

Secondary sources

 

 
 

County of Edessa
Battles involving the Zengid dynasty
Sieges of the Crusades
Battles of the Second Crusade
Conflicts in 1144
1144 in Asia
1140s in the Kingdom of Jerusalem
Massacres of Christians